Region XII or Region 12 in Roman numerals, may refer to:
Magallanes and Antartica Chilena Region, Chile
Soccsksargen, Philippines

Region name disambiguation pages